

The Center for Fiction's First Novel Prize is an annual award presented by The Center for Fiction, a non-profit organization in New York City, for the best debut novel. From 2006 to 2011, it was called the John Sargent, Sr. First Novel Prize in honor of John Turner Sargent, Sr., and, from 2011 to 2014, the Flaherty-Dunnan First Novel Prize, named after Center for Fiction board member Nancy Dunnan and her journalist father Ray W. Flaherty.

Publishers nominate English-language works by first-time United States novelists. There is a two-tiered selection process for the prize.  First, the nominees are read by a network of booklovers (referred to as Common Readers), including librarians, writers, staff, members, and friends of The Center for Fiction, giving rise to a long list of recommended books.  Next, the Common Readers' long list is forwarded to a committee of distinguished American writers, who select a short list, typically comprising five to seven titles, which is publicly announced in the late summer.  All finalists are invited to read from their works at a First Novel Fête, and the winning novel is then announced at an awards event—both events usually occurring in December.  The winning novelist receives a cash prize of $10,000; each finalist receives $1,000.

Recipients

See also
List of American literary awards

References

External links
The First Novel Prize, official website.

Awards established in 2006
First book awards
American fiction awards
2006 establishments in the United States
English-language literary awards